Domo (どーも) is the eighth original album by Kazumasa Oda, released on April 20, 2011.

Oda was 63 years old when he released this album; the album reached No. 1 on Oricon Album Chart, which made Kazumasa the oldest singer in Japanese chart history to achieve a No.1 album. The album was certified Platinum in Japan in July 2011.

Track listing 
All musics and lyrics are produced by Kazumasa Oda.
Of you (君のこと)
Goodbye  (グッバイ)
Wakaba no Hito (若葉のひと)
hello hello 
Anyone can do anything (誰れも どんなことも)
answer (こたえ)
Gentle rain (やさしい雨)
Don't say goodbye  (さよならは 言わない)
Somewhere today (今日も どこかで)
Tokyo sky (東京の空)

References

2011 albums